Finghin Collins (born 31 March 1977) is an Irish pianist.  He won first prize at the Clara Haskil International Piano Competition in Vevey, Switzerland, in 1999.

Studies and competitions 
Collins studied with John O'Conor at the Royal Irish Academy of Music in Dublin and with Dominique Merlet at the Conservatoire de Musique  in Geneva, Switzerland.  He was awarded a Bachelor of Arts in Music Performance from Dublin City University in 1999 and a premier prix avec distinction from the Conservatoire in Geneva in 2002. He won the RTÉ Musician of the Future Competition in Dublin in 1994, as well as semi-final prizes at the Leeds International Piano Competition in 1996, the Guardian Dublin International Piano Competition in 1997, and the Classical Category at the National Entertainment Awards in Ireland in 1998. In 1999, Collins won the top prize at the Clara Haskil International Piano Competition.

Performances 
Collins has performed with such orchestras as the Chicago Symphony Orchestra, Houston Symphony Orchestra, and Royal Philharmonic Orchestra; with such conductors as Christoph Eschenbach and Hans Graf; with ensembles such as London Winds and the Aviv, Callino, Chilingirian, and other string quartets; and with such instrumentalists as Isabelle van Keulen, Gwendolyn Masin, Miriam Fried, and Anthony Marwood.

Recordings 
In May 2005, RTÉ lyric fm released Collins's debut solo CD album, Impromptu. In May 2006, Claves Records released a double CD set featuring the piano music of Robert Schumann.

Collins was artist-in-residence at Waterford Institute of Technology from 2005 to 2009 and is artistic director of the New Ross Piano Festival and Music for Galway.

References

External links
Collins's official website

1977 births
Irish classical pianists
Living people
Musicians from County Dublin
Alumni of Dublin City University
Alumni of the Royal Irish Academy of Music
People educated at Gonzaga College
21st-century classical pianists